The Communauté de communes de la Touraine du Sud is a former federation of municipalities (communauté de communes) in the Indre-et-Loire département and in the Centre-Val de Loire région of France. It was created in December 2000. It was merged into the new Communauté de communes Loches Sud Touraine in January 2017. Its seat was in Preuilly-sur-Claise, but Descartes was the most populous commune of the communauté de communes.

Composition 
The Communauté de communes de la Touraine du Sud comprised 21 communes:

Abilly
Barrou
Betz-le-Château
Bossay-sur-Claise
Boussay
La Celle-Guenand
La Celle-Saint-Avant
Chambon
Charnizay
Chaumussay
Descartes
Ferrière-Larçon
Le Grand-Pressigny
La Guerche
Neuilly-le-Brignon
Paulmy
Le Petit-Pressigny
Preuilly-sur-Claise
Saint-Flovier
Tournon-Saint-Pierre
Yzeures-sur-Creuse

Demography

Politics and government

Intercommunal representation

See also
Communes of the Indre-et-Loire department
Commune communities in France

References

Touraine du Sud